A Brief Historical Retrospective is a 1997 compilation album by The Sea and Cake, released only in Japan. It consists solely of tracks from the band's first two studio albums, The Sea and Cake (1994) and Nassau (1995), plus the unrelated song "Glad You're Right".

Track listing

1997 compilation albums
The Sea and Cake albums